A relational contract is a contract whose effect is based upon a relationship of trust between the parties. The explicit terms of the contract are an outline implicit terms and understandings that determine the behaviour of the parties.

Ian Roderick Macneil Original Theory 
Relational contract theory was originally developed in the United States by the legal scholars Ian Roderick Macneil Stewart Macaulay.  According to Macneil it offered a response to the so-called “The Death of Contract” school’s nihilistic argument that a contract was not a fit subject for study as a whole; each different type of contract (e.g., sales, employment, negotiable instruments) could be studied individually, but not “contracts-in-gross”.

Macneil explains that this is only one of a number of possible relational theories of contracts, and accordingly renamed his own version “essential contract theory”.

Relational contract theory is characterized by a view of contracts as relations rather than as discrete transactions (which, Macneil argued, traditional “classical” or "neo-classical contract" theory treats contracts as being). Thus, even a simple transaction can properly be understood as involving a wider social and economic context. For instance, if A purchases a packet of cigarettes from a shop he has never been into before and will never enter again, that seems quite discrete. However, A will almost certainly have a loyalty to a particular brand of cigarettes and expectations about quality about which he would be prepared to complain to the manufacturer, although he has no contractual privity with the manufacturer. There is also an understanding that A will pay for the cigarettes, not simply run off with them, and that if he tenders a £10 note in exchange for the cigarettes which are priced at £6, the paper money will be acceptable and change of £4 will be given. None of this is explicitly stated between the parties, whose conversation is likely limited to “20 Marlboro, please” on A’s part and “That’ll be £6, please” on the part of the retailer. Thus, even the simplest transaction has a good deal that is unstated and dependent on a wider web of social and economic relations. How far outwards into that web one needs to investigate will depend on the transaction and on the purpose for which it is being examined.

Incentives play a large roll in the efficacy of a relational contract. If there were no relational contract where future compensation, performance or plans are only promised and not guaranteed, then there is very little incentive to honour the deal and perform. However, with a relational contract parties have incentive to provide quality goods/services as part of an ongoing relationship of good faith that will be beneficial to both parties.

Although earlier writing may be taken in places to suggest that the substantive rules of contract law need to be reframed to acknowledge the relational, non-discrete nature of contracts, this has not been subsequently pursued and current scholars have argued that it is neither possible nor necessary to reform the law of contract itself to work effectively with relationally-constituted contracts.

Other characteristics of relational contract theory are that “contract” is understood to cover economic exchange in general, not just contracts that would be recognized as legally enforceable agreements by courts in any given jurisdiction, that relations are mostly held together by their own internal values and wider social/economic factors, and, at least in relational theory in the Macneil mold, that exchange relations are governed by a number of norms. This last is not to say that relational contract theory is normative in nature, setting out what ought to be the case properly, but rather that there are actual observable normal characteristics or factors at play in relations. Macneil’s essential contract theory offers some 14 norms. These norms are as follows:
role integrity
reciprocity
implementation of planning
effectuation of consent
flexibility
contractual solidarity
the ‘linking norms’ 
the power norm
propriety of means
harmonisation with the social matrix
enhancing discreteness and presentation
preservation of the relation
harmonisation of relational conflict
supracontract norms.

Comprehensive contract theory 
The English contracts scholar Richard Austen-Baker has more recently proposed a developed version of relational contract theory, called “comprehensive contract theory”, which posits four “comprehensive contract norms” in place of Macneil’s 14, though Austen-Baker does not deny the validity of Macneil’s norms as a complex tool of analysis. While Austen-Baker appreciates Macneil's norms, the four that he proposes aims to eliminate the large amount of overlap seen in Macneil's version of the norms. Here the “comprehensive contract theory” norms have a much wider scope as to not extend over the other norms. These four norms are: 
preservation of the relation
harmonisation with the social matrix
satisfying performance expectations
substantial fairness.

As Austen-Baker builds his theory, developing Macneil's work a cross-over can be seen from the two lists of norms. This is norm one and two in “comprehensive contract theory”. While they have the same title the meaning changes from Macneil's work. The first norm, preservation of the relation pertains to the advantages gained through better relations. There are seven reasons that Austen-Baker gives, the first being that there is an increased cost in trying to find new customers as opposed to retaining existing ones. The second is that outside of existing relations transaction costs could be higher. Another point offered is that the inconvenience and cognitive effort of changing suppliers incentivises maintaining the relationship. Furthermore Austen-Baker explains the benefit of a long-term and meaningful relationship as parties will be better able to understand and advise each other for their specific needs. Some forms of business require high levels of trust which is hard to establish therefore encouraging relational contracts. Non-economic satisfactions also increase with the use of relational contracts, this could be seen as joy from going to a regular store and speaking with a manager that you know well. Finally, there is much greater stability gained through the longevity of a relationship. The second norm is the harmonisation with the social matrix, this norm seeks to encompass the use of every norm know to man to apply to contracts. It is unclear how much would be possible in a contract with this norm, therefore deters people from trying it. The third norm is satisfying the performance expectations, this explains how adequate or better performance is satisfactory however if you were to fail to meet the requirement you could be obliged to pay for any damages due to the reduced quality of work. Which in turn could tarnish the relationship. The final norm is substantial fairness, which is the equality of the relationship. If something is given then it would be fair for something to be given back in exchange, this does not have to be formal and could be inclusive of something like customary behaviour. 

The Japanese scholar Takashi Uchida has proposed a version of relational contract theory inspired by Macneil, relating it to the Japanese situation. Other notable contributions to relational contract theory have been made by Stewart Macaulay (U.S.), Lisa Bernstein (U.S.), David Campbell (England) and John Wightman (England).

Recent research from World Commerce & Contracting, the University of Tennessee and Cirio law firm takes the relational contracting theories expressed by Macneil, Macaulay and others to make them relevant for contracting practitioners trying to craft strategic, collaborative, win-win relationships with their procurement and outsourced business partners. The white paper, outlines basic tenets that are foundational to relational contracting, including communication, risk allocation, problem-solving, no-blame culture, joint working, gain and pain sharing, mutual objectives, performance measurement and continuous improvement.

In 2019, David Frydlinger, Oliver Hart and Kate Vitasek collaborated on a Harvard Business Review article, "A New Approach to Contracts: How to Build Better long-term strategic partnerships". The authors advocated for a “formal” relational contract, asserting that "a formal relational contract lays a foundation of trust, specifies mutual goals, and establishes governance structures to keep the parties’ expectations and interests aligned over time."

Further research on relational contracting resulted in the 2021 book Contracting in the New Economy: Using Relational Contracts to Boost Trust and Collaboration in Strategic Business Relationships. The book argues for adopting formal relational contracts as an alternative to transactional contracts and suggests formal relational contracts are well suited for strategic, complex and highly dependent contractual relationships. The Nobel laureate Oliver Hart's foreword in the book notes, “…for a long time I have felt that the traditional approach to contracts, where lawyers try to think of all the possible things that can go wrong in a relationship and include contractual provisions to deal with them, is broken.” Hart added that it “never worked that well, and in an increasingly complex and uncertain world it works even worse.”
  
The book provides a comprehensive review into the history and theory behind relational contracting and provides a practitioner’s perspective that includes a five-step process for developing a relational contract:
 
 Lay the foundation
 Create a shared vision and objectives
 Adopt guiding principles.
 Align expectations and interests
 Stay aligned

Examples of relational contracts

Construction examples
 Integrated Form of Agreement (IFoA) (USA) - developed for Sutter Health projects in California and used by some other healthcare providers
 ConsensusDocs 300 (USA) - a derivative of IFoA
 AIA C191-2009 Standard Form Multi-Party Agreement for IPD (USA)
 AIA C199-2010 Standard Form of Agreement Between Single Purpose Entity and Contractor for Integrated Project Delivery
 PPC2000 International (UK)
 Alliancing Agreement (Australia) - not yet a standard form but moving in that direction
 Integrated Project Delivery Agreement (Profit Deferred Until Final Completion)(USA)
 U.S Department of Energy - transformation of a former weapons facility to a wildlife refuge
 FFG Enterprise: a collaboration underpinned by a relational contract between the Royal Australian Navy, Defense Industry, and the Capability, Acquisition and Sustainment Group (CASG)

See also
 Ian Roderick Macneil

References

Business law
Contract law